Murlough Bay in County Antrim, Northern Ireland is a bay on the north coast of Northern Ireland between Fair Head and Torr Head.  It is known for its outstanding beauty and remote location, with close views of Rathlin Island and views across the sea to the Mull of Kintyre, Islay, Jura and various other Scottish islands.
The local geology is typical of the Antrim topography with basalt overlaying sandstone and limestone.  The area has many kilns used in the production of lime.

Historical importance 

The original Gaelic name was Muir-bolc. According to the 11th century 'Preface to the Amra Coluim Cille', Murlough Bay was the place where Saint Columba landed after sailing from Iona to Ireland to attend the Synod of Drumceat c.595 AD.
  
Although he is now buried in Dublin, Murlough Bay was the burial place of choice of Roger Casement, a former British Government Diplomat, knighted by King George V in 1911 and Irish Nationalist revolutionary leader who was executed by the Government of the United Kingdom for treason in August 1916 during World War I. While waiting execution in Pentonville prison he sent a letter to his cousin Gertrude Bannister in which he  wrote  "Take my body back with you and let it lie in the old churchyard in Murlough Bay."  Roger Casement was a frequent visitor to Ballycastle, he stayed with relatives there and found a close affinity to the beauty and wildness of the location. The plinth is what remains of a more recent cross which was erected on the site to commemorate Sir Roger Casement.

Each August there is a small memorial held in his honour at Murlough by Republican Sinn Féin.

See also
Fair Head

References

External links

Landforms of County Antrim
Bays of Northern Ireland